John A. Lomakoski  (November 11, 1940 – February 16, 1999) was an American football player.

Early years
Lomakoski was born in 1940 in Washington, Michigan, and attended Romeo High School in northern Macomb County, Michigan. He played college football for the Western Michigan Broncos from 1958 to 1961. He was twice selected as an all-conference player and was invited to play in the Senior Bowl after his senior year.

Professional football
He was selected by the Detroit Lions in the fourth round (48th overall pick) of the 1962 NFL Draft. He signed a contract to play for the Lions in December 1961.  He appeared in three games at the offensive tackle position for the team during its 1962 season. In June 1963, he signed a contract to return to the Lions, but he was released in August 1963.

Later years
After his football career ended, Lomakoski worked as a sales representative for Procter & Gamble.  He retired in Munising, Michigan, where he died in 1999 at age 58. He was survived by his wife Karen, daughter Sarah Elizabeth, and son John David.

References

1940 births
1999 deaths
American football tackles
Detroit Lions players
Western Michigan Broncos football players
Players of American football from Michigan
People from Romeo, Michigan
Sportspeople from Metro Detroit